Frank Wiley Wilson (June 21, 1917 – September 29, 1982) was a United States district judge of the United States District Court for the Eastern District of Tennessee.

Education and career

Born in Knoxville, Tennessee, Wilson received an Artium Baccalaureus degree from the University of Tennessee in 1939 and a Juris Doctor from the University of Tennessee College of Law in 1941. He was in private practice in Knoxville from 1941 to 1942. He was in the United States Army Air Forces as a Sergeant from 1942 to 1946. He was in private practice in Knoxville from 1946 to 1961.

Federal judicial service

Wilson was nominated by President John F. Kennedy on May 24, 1961, to a seat on the United States District Court for the Eastern District of Tennessee vacated by Judge Leslie Rogers Darr. He was confirmed by the United States Senate on June 14, 1961, and received his commission on June 15, 1961. He served as Chief Judge from 1969 to 1982. His service terminated on September 29, 1982, due to his death.

Wilson is perhaps best known for overseeing the landmark 1964 trial of union leader Jimmy Hoffa in U.S. v. Hoffa.  The original trial was held in Nashville, Tennessee, but had to be moved to Chattanooga after the cases ended with a mistrial and allegations of jury tampering.  Wilson presided over the subsequent trial in Chattanooga, Tennessee in which Hoffa was tried for jury tampering, mail and wire fraud, and conspiracy. After a 13-week long trial, Hoffa was found guilty on four of twenty counts he faced.

References

Sources
 

1917 births
1982 deaths
Judges of the United States District Court for the Eastern District of Tennessee
United States district court judges appointed by John F. Kennedy
20th-century American judges
University of Tennessee alumni
University of Tennessee College of Law alumni
United States Army Air Forces non-commissioned officers
20th-century American lawyers
United States Army Air Forces personnel of World War II